Night Train for Inverness is a black and white 1960 British drama film directed by Ernest Morris and starring Norman Wooland, Jane Hylton and Dennis Waterman. It is notable as the film debut of Dennis Waterman. The film was referenced in an episode of the Minder Podcast.

Plot
Roy Lewis, just released from gaol, kidnaps his young son Ted and takes him on a train bound for Inverness. However, Lewis doesn't know that Ted is diabetic and faces death without regular insulin injections. Meanwhile, a police manhunt is launched.

Partial cast
 Norman Wooland - Roy Lewis 
 Jane Hylton - Marion Crane
 Dennis Waterman - Ted Lewis 
 Silvia Francis - Ann Lewis
 Valentine Dyall - Inspector Kent 
 Irene Arnold - Mrs Wall
 Colin Tapley - Dr Jackson
 Howard Lang - Sergeant 
 Kaplan Kaye - Charles

Critical reception
TV Guide gave it two out of four stars, calling it an "average drama." while The List gave it three out of five stars, and wrote, "this tight, train-bound 1960 thriller has a lot to commend it...Gutsy (for its time) and very watchable." The film historians Steve Chibnall and Brian McFarlane say "it generates genuine suspense from a neatly plotted screenplay".

References

External links

1960 films
Films directed by Ernest Morris
1960 drama films
British drama films
Films shot at New Elstree Studios
1960s English-language films
1960s British films